In mathematics, a topos (plural topoi  or , or toposes) is a category that behaves like the category of sheaves of sets on a topological space (or more generally: on a site). Topoi behave much like the category of sets and possess a notion of localization; they are a direct generalization of point-set topology.  The Grothendieck topoi find applications in algebraic geometry; the more general elementary topoi are used in logic.

The mathematical field that studies topoi is called topos theory.

Grothendieck topos (topos in geometry)
Since the introduction of sheaves into mathematics in the 1940s, a major theme has been to study a space by studying sheaves on a space.  This idea was expounded by Alexander Grothendieck by introducing the notion of a "topos". The main utility of this notion is in the abundance of situations in mathematics where topological heuristics are very effective, but an honest topological space is lacking; it is sometimes possible to find a topos formalizing the heuristic. An important example of this programmatic idea is the étale topos of a scheme. Another illustration of the capability of Grothendieck toposes to incarnate the “essence” of different mathematical situations is given by their use as bridges for connecting theories which, albeit written in possibly very different languages, share a common mathematical content.

Equivalent definitions
A Grothendieck topos is a category C which satisfies any one of the following three properties. (A theorem of Jean Giraud states that the properties below are all equivalent.)
 There is a small category D and an inclusion C ↪ Presh(D) that admits a finite-limit-preserving left adjoint.
 C is the category of sheaves on a Grothendieck site.
 C satisfies Giraud's axioms, below.

Here Presh(D) denotes the category of contravariant functors from D to the category of sets; such a contravariant functor is frequently called a presheaf.

Giraud's axioms
Giraud's axioms for a category C are:
 C has a small set of generators, and admits all small colimits.  Furthermore,  fiber products distribute over coproducts. That is, given a set I, an I-indexed coproduct mapping to A, and a morphism A → A, the pullback is an I-indexed coproduct of the pullbacks: 
 Sums in C are disjoint.  In other words, the fiber product of X and Y over their sum is the initial object in C.
 All equivalence relations in C are effective.

The last axiom needs the most explanation.  If X is an object of C, an "equivalence relation" R on X is a map R → X × X in C
such that for any object Y in C, the induced map Hom(Y, R) → Hom(Y, X) × Hom(Y, X) gives an  ordinary equivalence relation on the set Hom(Y, X).  Since C has colimits we may form the coequalizer of the two maps R → X; call this X/R.  The equivalence relation is "effective" if the canonical map

is an isomorphism.

Examples
Giraud's theorem already gives "sheaves on sites" as a complete list of examples.  Note, however, that nonequivalent sites often give
rise to equivalent topoi.  As indicated in the introduction, sheaves on ordinary topological spaces motivate many of the basic definitions and results of topos theory.

 Category of sets and G-sets 
The category of sets is an important special case: it plays the role of a point in topos theory. Indeed, a set may be thought of as a sheaf on a point since functors on the singleton category with a single object and only the identity morphism are just specific sets in the category of sets.

Similarly, there is a topos  for any group  which is equivalent to the category of -sets. We construct this as the category of presheaves on the category with one object, but now the set of morphisms is given by the group . Since any functor must give a -action on the target, this gives the category of -sets.

 Topoi from ringed spaces 
More exotic examples, and the raison d'être of topos theory, come from algebraic geometry. The basic example of a topos comes from the Zariski topos of a scheme. For each scheme  there is a site  (of objects given by open subsets and morphisms given by inclusions) whose category of presheaves forms the Zarisksi topos . But once distinguished classes of morphisms are considered, there are multiple generalizations of this which leads to non-trivial mathematics. Moreover, topoi give the foundations for studying schemes purely as functors on the category of algebras.

To a scheme and even a stack one may associate an étale topos, an fppf topos, or a Nisnevich topos. Another important example of a topos is from the crystalline site. In the case of the étale topos, these form the foundational objects of study in anabelian geometry, which studies objects in algebraic geometry that are determined entirely by the structure of their étale fundamental group.

Pathologies
Topos theory is, in some sense, a generalization of classical point-set topology.  One should therefore expect to see old and new instances of pathological behavior.  For instance, there is an example due to Pierre Deligne of a nontrivial topos that has no points (see below for the definition of points of a topos).

Geometric morphisms
Note that u∗ automatically preserves colimits by virtue of having a right adjoint.

By Freyd's adjoint functor theorem, to give a geometric morphism X → Y is to give a functor u∗: Y → X that preserves finite limits and all small colimits. Thus geometric morphisms between topoi may be seen as analogues of maps of locales.

Points of topoi

If X is an ordinary space and x is a point of X, then the functor that takes a sheaf F to its stalk Fx has a right adjoint
(the "skyscraper sheaf" functor), so an ordinary point of X also determines a topos-theoretic point.  These may be constructed as the pullback-pushforward along the continuous map x: 1 → X.

For the etale topos  of a space , a point is a bit more refined of an object. Given a point  of the underlying scheme  a point  of the topos  is then given by a separable field extension  of  such that the associated map  factors through the original point . Then, the factorization map  is an etale morphism of schemes.

More precisely, those are the global points. They are not adequate in themselves for displaying the space-like aspect of a topos, because a non-trivial topos may fail to have any. Generalized points are geometric morphisms from a topos Y (the stage of definition) to X. There are enough of these to display the space-like aspect. For example, if X is the classifying topos S[T] for a geometric theory T, then the universal property says that its points are the models of T (in any stage of definition Y).

Essential geometric morphisms
A geometric morphism (u∗,u∗) is essential if u∗ has a further left adjoint u!, or equivalently (by the adjoint functor theorem) if u∗ preserves not only finite but all small limits.

Ringed topoi

A ringed topos is a pair (X,R), where X is a topos and R is a commutative ring object in X.  Most of the constructions of ringed spaces go through for ringed topoi.  The category of R-module objects in X is an abelian category with enough injectives.  A more useful abelian category is the subcategory of quasi-coherent R-modules: these are R-modules that admit a presentation.

Another important class of ringed topoi, besides ringed spaces, are the étale topoi of Deligne–Mumford stacks.

Homotopy theory of topoi
Michael Artin and Barry Mazur associated to the site underlying a topos a pro-simplicial set (up to homotopy). (It's better to consider it in Ho(pro-SS); see Edwards) Using this inverse system of simplicial sets one may sometimes associate to a homotopy invariant in classical topology an inverse system of invariants in topos theory. The study of the pro-simplicial set associated to the étale topos of a scheme is called étale homotopy theory. In good cases (if the scheme is Noetherian and geometrically unibranch), this pro-simplicial set is pro-finite.

Elementary topoi (topoi in logic)

Introduction
Since the early 20th century, the predominant axiomatic foundation of mathematics has been set theory, in which all mathematical objects are ultimately represented by sets (including functions, which map between sets).  More recent work in category theory allows this foundation to be generalized using topoi; each topos completely defines its own mathematical framework.  The category of sets forms a familiar topos, and working within this topos is equivalent to using traditional set-theoretic mathematics.  But one could instead choose to work with many alternative topoi.  A standard formulation of the axiom of choice makes sense in any topos, and there are topoi in which it is invalid.  Constructivists will be interested to work in a topos without the law of excluded middle.  If symmetry under a particular group G is of importance, one can use the topos consisting of all G-sets.

It is also possible to encode an algebraic theory, such as the theory of groups, as a topos, in the form of a classifying topos. The individual models of the theory, i.e. the groups in our example, then correspond to functors from the encoding topos to the category of sets that respect the topos structure.

Formal definition
When used for foundational work a topos will be defined axiomatically; set theory is then treated as a special case of topos theory. Building from category theory, there are multiple equivalent definitions of a topos. The following has the virtue of being concise:

A topos is a category that has the following two properties:
 All limits taken over finite index categories exist.
 Every object has a power object. This plays the role of the powerset in set theory.

First note that for every object , a morphism  ("a family of subsets") induces a subobject . Formally, this is defined by pulling back  along . The universal property of a power object is that every relation arises in this way, giving a bijective correspondence between relations  and morphisms .

From finite limits and power objects one can derive that
 All colimits taken over finite index categories exist.
 The category has a subobject classifier.
 The category is Cartesian closed.

In some applications, the role of the subobject classifier is pivotal, whereas power objects are not. Thus some definitions reverse the roles of what is defined and what is derived.

Logical functors
A logical functor is a functor between toposes that preserves finite limits and power objects. Logical functors preserve the structures that toposes have. In particular, they preserve finite colimits, subobject classifiers, and exponential objects.

Explanation
A topos as defined above can be understood as a Cartesian closed category for which the notion of subobject of an object has an elementary or first-order definition.  This notion, as a natural categorical abstraction of the notions of subset of a set, subgroup of a group, and more generally subalgebra of any algebraic structure, predates the notion of topos.  It is definable in any category, not just topoi, in second-order language, i.e. in terms of classes of morphisms instead of individual morphisms, as follows.  Given two monics m, n from respectively Y and Z to X, we say that m ≤ n when there exists a morphism p: Y → Z for which np = m, inducing a preorder on monics to X.  When m ≤ n and n ≤ m we say that m and n are equivalent.  The subobjects of X are the resulting equivalence classes of the monics to it.

In a topos "subobject" becomes, at least implicitly, a first-order notion, as follows.

As noted above, a topos is a category C having all finite limits and hence in particular the empty limit or final object 1.  It is then natural to treat morphisms of the form x: 1 → X as elements x ∈ X.  Morphisms f: X → Y thus correspond to functions mapping each element x ∈ X to the element fx ∈ Y, with application realized by composition.

One might then think to define a subobject of X as an equivalence class of monics m: X′ → X having the same image { mx | x ∈ X′ }.  The catch is that two or more morphisms may correspond to the same function, that is, we cannot assume that C is concrete in the sense that the functor C(1,-): C → Set is faithful.  For example the category Grph of  graphs and their associated homomorphisms is a topos whose final object 1 is the graph with one vertex and one edge (a self-loop), but is not concrete because the elements 1 → G of a graph G correspond only to the self-loops and not the other edges, nor the vertices without self-loops.  Whereas the second-order definition makes G and the subgraph of all self-loops of G (with their vertices) distinct subobjects of G (unless every edge is, and every vertex has, a self-loop), this image-based one does not.  This can be addressed for the graph example and related examples via the Yoneda Lemma as described in the Further examples section below, but this then ceases to be first-order.  Topoi provide a more abstract, general, and first-order solution.

As noted above, a topos C has a subobject classifier Ω, namely an object of C with an element t ∈ Ω, the generic subobject of C, having the property that every monic m: X′ → X arises as a pullback of the generic subobject along a unique morphism f: X → Ω, as per Figure 1.  Now the pullback of a monic is a monic, and all elements including t are monics since there is only one morphism to 1 from any given object, whence the pullback of t along f: X → Ω is a monic.  The monics to X are therefore in bijection with the pullbacks of t along morphisms from X to Ω.  The latter morphisms partition the monics into equivalence classes each determined by a morphism f: X → Ω, the characteristic morphism of that class, which we take to be the subobject of X characterized or named by f.

All this applies to any topos, whether or not concrete.  In the concrete case, namely C(1,-) faithful, for example the category of sets, the situation reduces to the familiar behavior of functions.  Here the monics m: X′ → X are exactly the injections (one-one functions) from X′ to X, and those with a given image { mx | x ∈ X′ } constitute the subobject of X corresponding to the morphism f: X → Ω for which f−1(t) is that image.  The monics of a subobject will in general have many domains, all of which however will be in bijection with each other.

To summarize, this first-order notion of subobject classifier implicitly defines for a topos the same equivalence relation on monics to X as had previously been defined explicitly by the second-order notion of subobject for any category.  The notion of equivalence relation on a class of morphisms is itself intrinsically second-order, which the definition of topos neatly sidesteps by explicitly defining only the notion of subobject classifier Ω, leaving the notion of subobject of X as an implicit consequence characterized (and hence namable) by its associated morphism f: X → Ω.

Further examples and non-examples
Every Grothendieck topos is an elementary topos, but the converse is not true (since every Grothendieck topos is cocomplete, which is not required from an elementary topos).

The categories of finite sets, of finite G-sets (actions of a group G on a finite set), and of finite graphs are elementary topoi that are not Grothendieck topoi.

If C is a small category, then the functor category SetC (consisting of all covariant functors from C to sets, with natural transformations as morphisms) is a topos. For instance, the category Grph of graphs of the kind permitting multiple directed edges between two vertices is a topos. Such a graph consists of two sets, an edge set and a vertex set, and two functions s,t between those sets, assigning to every edge e its source s(e) and target t(e).  Grph is thus equivalent to the functor category SetC, where C is the category with two objects E and V and two morphisms s,t: E → V giving respectively the source and target of each edge.

The Yoneda lemma asserts that Cop embeds in SetC as a full subcategory.  In the graph example the embedding represents Cop as the subcategory of SetC whose two objects are V'  as the one-vertex no-edge graph and E'  as the two-vertex one-edge graph (both as functors), and whose two nonidentity morphisms are the two graph homomorphisms from V'  to E'  (both as natural transformations).  The natural transformations from V'  to an arbitrary graph (functor) G constitute the vertices of G while those from E'  to G constitute its edges.  Although SetC, which we can identify with Grph, is not made concrete by either V'  or E'  alone, the functor U: Grph → Set2 sending object G to the pair of sets (Grph(V' ,G), Grph(E' ,G)) and morphism h: G → H to the pair of functions (Grph(V' ,h), Grph(E' ,h)) is faithful.  That is, a morphism of graphs can be understood as a pair of functions, one mapping the vertices and the other the edges, with application still realized as composition but now with multiple sorts of generalized elements.  This shows that the traditional concept of a concrete category as one whose objects have an underlying set can be generalized to cater for a wider range of topoi by allowing an object to have multiple underlying sets, that is, to be multisorted.

The category of abelian groups is also not a topos, for a similar reason: every group homomorphism must map 0 to 0.

See also

 History of topos theory
 Homotopy hypothesis
 Intuitionistic type theory
 ∞-topos
 Quasitopos
 Geometric logic

Notes

References
Some gentle papers

 A gentle introduction.
 Steven Vickers: "Toposes pour les nuls" and "Toposes pour les vraiment nuls." Elementary and even more elementary introductions to toposes as generalized spaces.

The following texts are easy-paced introductions to toposes and the basics of category theory. They should be suitable for those knowing little mathematical logic and set theory, even non-mathematicians.
 An "introduction to categories for computer scientists, logicians, physicists, linguists, etc." (cited from cover text).
 Introduces the foundations of mathematics from a categorical perspective.
Grothendieck foundational work on toposes:
 Tome 2 270'''  
The following monographs include an introduction to some or all of topos theory, but do not cater primarily to beginning students. Listed in (perceived) order of increasing difficulty.
 A nice introduction to the basics of category theory, topos theory, and topos logic. Assumes very few prerequisites.
  A good start. Available online at Robert Goldblatt's homepage.
 Version available online at John Bell's homepage.
 More complete, and more difficult to read.
 (Online version). More concise than Sheaves in Geometry and Logic'', but hard on beginners.

Reference works for experts, less suitable for first introduction

 The third part of "Borceux' remarkable magnum opus", as Johnstone has labelled it. Still suitable as an introduction, though beginners may find it hard to recognize the most relevant results among the huge amount of material given.
 For a long time the standard compendium on topos theory. However, even Johnstone describes this work as "far too hard to read, and not for the faint-hearted."
 As of early 2010, two of the scheduled three volumes of this overwhelming compendium were available.

Books that target special applications of topos theory
 Includes many interesting special applications.

Foundations of mathematics
 
Sheaf theory